Minnesota Citizens Concerned for Life (MCCL) is the oldest and largest anti-abortion organization in Minnesota. Founded in 1968 to resist the legalization of abortion, MCCL works through education, legislation and political action to oppose abortion, infanticide, euthanasia, assisted suicide and embryonic stem cell research.

MCCL has more than 70,000 member families and 240 chapters across the state of Minnesota. Non-sectarian and non-partisan, MCCL's mission is "to secure protection for innocent human life from conception until natural death through effective education, legislation and political action." Many in the anti-abortion movement regard MCCL as one of the most effective state anti-abortion organizations in the country.

MCCL's executive director is Scott Fischbach, husband of former Lieutenant-Governor and President of the Minnesota State Senate Michelle Fischbach. Michelle has authored and backed a number of anti-abortion bills during her time as Minority and Majority leader of the senate.

MCCL organizes an annual anti-abortion rally at the state capitol in Saint Paul.

References

External links
 

Anti-abortion organizations in the United States
Organizations established in 1968
Organizations based in Minnesota